Stanislav Khegai (born 1985) is a Kazakhstani pianist. He is the winner of the 2014 European Piano Contest Bremen and the prizewinner of the Queen Elisabeth International Music Competition in Brussels and the Concours Géza Anda in Zurich. He was awarded with second prize at the III International Scriabin Piano Competition in Moscow and Grand-Prix at the International Piano Competition of Central Asia.

Biography 
At fifteen, he was awarded the Grand-Prix at the International Piano Competition of Central Asia. The following year he played Rachmaninoff's Piano Concerto No. 3 with the Philharmonic Orchestra. At the age of 18, he received the 2nd Prize in the Third International Scriabin Piano Competition in Moscow. In 2006, he was awarded the Arirang Prize in Arts in Kazakhstan. He is the prizewinner of the 15th Queen Elisabeth International Music Competition in Brussels, Belgium and the 10th Concours Géza Anda in Zurich, Switzerland.

In March 2014, he became the winner of the 2014 European Piano Contest Bremen (Germany). He was awarded three times the DAAD Scholarship (Bonn, Germany).

Khegai gave recitals in Germany, France, Belgium, Switzerland, Italy, Morocco, Estonia, Kazakhstan, Russia, Japan, Canada and South Korea. In November 2013, he performed Brahms's Piano Concerto No. 2 in the Great Hall of Gewandhaus zu Leipzig. He gave concerts in world venues, such as Palais des Beaux-Arts BOZAR and the Théâtre Royal de la Monnaie (Brussels), the Salle Cortot (Paris), the Gewandhaus (Leipzig), the Glocke and the Radio Bremen Sendesaal (Bremen), the Great Hall of Tchaikovsky Conservatory (Moscow), the Guro Arts Valley Theater (Seoul), the Gasteig (Munich), the Ansan Arts Center (South Korea) and has performed with prestigious orchestras, such as Leipzig Gewandhaus Orchestra, the Orchestre National de Belgique, the Bremen Philharmonic, the Orchestre Royal de Chambre de Wallonie, the Moscow Symphony Orchestra, the Moravian Philharmonic and the Gyeonggi Philharmonic Orchestra. He has collaborated with conductors like Gilbert Varga, Paul Goodwin, Nicholas Milton, Mathias Foremny and Volker Schmidt-Gertenbach, among others.

In the 2008–2009 season, he toured Germany with the Moravian Philharmonic Orchestra performing Beethoven's Piano Concerto No. 1, Op. 15. In July 2007, he performed a recital at the Mecklenburg–Vorpommern Festival with the works of Schubert, Brahms, Beethoven and Schumann. Stanislav Khegai gave recitals at Festivals, such as Les Nuits Musicales de Nice Festival (France), the Pianissimo Festival in Tartu, the 2010 Asian Composers League International Festival and the UNESCO–Forum in Seoul. In April 2017, he performed, among other works, Ravel's Miroirs at the After Work Concert Series in the Leipzig Gewandhaus. He was broadcast live by Radio Bremen, NDR, MDR (Germany), RTBF, Klara Radio, Musiq3 (Belgium), TV–Kultura (Russia) and KBS (South Korea).

Discography 
Maurice Ravel: Miroirs (Radio Bremen)
Johannes Brahms: 4 Ballades, Op. 10 (Radio Bremen)
Ludwig van Beethoven: Sonata No. 23 "Appassionata", Op. 57 (Queen Elisabeth Competition Winners CD)
Alexander Scriabin: Mazurka Op. 25 No. 3 – Valse in A-flat major Op. 38 – Sonata No. 9 Op. 68 (Classical Records, Moscow)

References 

1985 births
Living people
Classical pianists
20th-century classical pianists
21st-century classical pianists
Prize-winners of the Queen Elisabeth Competition
Kazakhstani classical pianists
Male classical pianists
20th-century male musicians
21st-century male musicians